In folklore, giants (from Ancient Greek: gigas, cognate giga-) are beings of human-like appearance, but are at times prodigious in size and strength or bear an otherwise notable appearance. The word giant is first attested in 1297 from Robert of Gloucester's chronicle. It is derived from the Gigantes of Greek mythology.

Fairy tales such as Jack the Giant Killer have formed the modern perception of giants as dimwitted ogres, sometimes said to eat humans, while other giants tend to eat the livestock. The antagonist in Jack and the Beanstalk is often described as a giant. In some more recent portrayals, like those of Jonathan Swift and Roald Dahl, some giants are both intelligent and friendly.

Literary and cultural analysis
Giants appear in the folklore of cultures worldwide as they represent a relatively simple concept. Representing the human body enlarged to the point of being monstrous, giants evoke terror and remind humans of their body's frailty and mortality. They are often portrayed as monsters and antagonists, but there are exceptions. Some giants intermingle with humans in a friendly way and can even be part of human families with their offspring being portrayed as regular humans.

Religion and mythology

Abrahamic

Genesis tells of the Nephilim before and after Noah's Flood. The word Nephilim is loosely translated as giants in some translations of the Hebrew Bible, but left untranslated in others.

 The Anakim
 The Amorites
 The Rephaites, also known as The Emites

The Book of Numbers includes the discouraging report by the spies who Moses sent into Canaan: “We can’t attack those people; they are stronger than we are. (...) All the people we saw there are of great size. We saw the Nephilim there (the descendants of Anak come from the Nephilim). We seemed like grasshoppers in our own eyes, and we looked the same to them.” However, the Book of Joshua, describing the actual conquest of Canaan in a later generation, makes no reference to such people living there.

The Bible also tells of Gog and Magog, who later entered European folklore, and of the famous battle between David and the Philistine Goliath. While Goliath is often portrayed as a giant in retellings of the Biblical narrative, he appears to be significantly smaller than other giants, biblical or otherwise. The Masoretic Text version of the Book of Samuel gives his height as six cubits and one span (possibly ), while the Septuagint, the 1st-century Jewish historian Flavius Josephus and the 2nd–1st-centuries BCE Dead Sea Scrolls give Goliath's height as four cubits and one span (possibly ). For comparison, the Anakites are described as making the Israelites seem like grasshoppers. See also Gibborim.

Josephus also described the Amorites as giants in his Antiquities of the Jews, circa 93CE, indicating that some sort of fossils may have been on display at that time: "For which reason they removed their camp to Hebron; and when they had taken it, they slew all the inhabitants. There were till then left the race of giants, who had bodies so large, and countenances so entirely different from other men, that they were surprising to the sight, and terrible to the hearing. The bones of these men are still shown to this very day, unlike to any credible relations of other men."

The Book of Enoch describes giants as the offspring of Watchers and women in 7:2.

Armenian
Hayk was known as the founder of the Armenian state. Hayk was part of a race of giants who helped construct the Tower of Babel. Ancient historian Movses Khorenatsi wrote, "Hayk was handsome and personable, with curly hair, sparkling eyes and strong arms. Among the giants he was the bravest and most famous, opponent of all who raised their hand to become absolute ruler over the giants and heroes."

Mount Nemrut is known to have received its name from an Armenian tradition in which Nimrod was killed by an arrow shot by Hayk during a massive battle between two rival armies of giants to the south-east of Lake Van.

Basque
Giants are rough but generally righteous characters of formidable strength living in the hills of the Basque Country. Giants stand for the Basque people reluctant to convert to Christianity who decide to stick to the old lifestyle and customs in the forest. Sometimes they hold the secret of ancient techniques and wisdom unknown to the Christians, like in the legend of San Martin Txiki, while their most outstanding feature is their strength. It follows that in many legends all over the Basque territory the giants are held accountable for the creation of many stone formations, hills and ages-old megalithic structures (dolmens, etc.), with similar explanations provided in different spots.

However, giants show different variants and forms, they are most frequently referred to as jentilak and mairuak, while as individuals they can be represented as Basajaun ("the lord of the forests"), Sanson (variation of the biblical Samson), Errolan (based on the Frankish army general Roland who fell dead at the Battle of Roncevaux Pass) or even Tartalo (a one-eyed giant akin to the Greek Cyclops Polyphemus).

Bulgarian

In Bulgarian mythology, giants called ispolini inhabited the Earth before modern humans. They lived in the mountains, fed on raw meat and often fought against dragons. Ispolini were afraid of blackberries which posed a danger of making the giants trip and die, so they offered sacrifices to that plant.

Chilean

There are tales of giants in the northern Chilean port town of Caldera telling of giants who play with ships moving them from one port to another. Tales of the same area also tells of giants who are able to crush humans with their feet and when laying down to sleep being so long as to reach from the mountains to the sea. In some stories the giants are black humanoids or black bulls. In southern Chile there are stories of giants said to belong to certain volcanoes such as Calbuco and Osorno.

The mythical city of Tololo Pampa in northern Chile is said to be guarded by a giant known by various names including; Pata Larga, Gigante Minero and Minero Gigante. The giant enters to the mountains to obtain riches to the princess of Tololo Pampa. If a person manages to watch the giant while he works folklore says the person will be blessed with good luck in the rest of his life.

Greek

In Greek mythology, the Gigantes (γίγαντες) were (according to the poet Hesiod) the children of Uranus (Ουρανός) and Gaia (Γαία) (spirits of the sky and the earth) where some depictions had them with snake-like legs. They were involved in a conflict with the Olympian gods called the Gigantomachy (Γιγαντομαχία) when Gaia had them attack Mount Olympus. This battle was eventually settled when the hero Heracles decided to help the Olympians. The Greeks believed some of them, like Enceladus, to lie buried from that time under the earth and that their tormented quivers resulted in earthquakes and volcanic eruptions.

Herodotus in Book 1, Chapter 68, describes how the Spartans uncovered in Tegea the body of Orestes, which was seven cubits long ⁠ ⁠—  approximately 3.73m, or about 12feet 3inches. In his book The Comparison of Romulus with Theseus, Plutarch describes how the Athenians uncovered the body of Theseus, which was "of more than ordinary size." The kneecaps of Ajax were exactly the size of a discus for the boy's pentathlon, wrote Pausanias.

The Cyclopes are also compared to giants due to their huge size (e.g.Polyphemus, son of Poseidon and Thoosa and nemesis of Odysseus in Homer's The Odyssey). The Elder Cyclopes were the children of Gaia and Uranus, and later made Zeus' "master thunderbolt", Poseidon's trident, and Hades' "helm of darkness", during the Titanomachy.

The Hecatoncheires are giants that have 100 arms and 50 heads who were also the children of Gaia and Uranus.

Other known giant races in Greek mythology include the six-armed Gegeines, the northern Hyperboreans, and the cannibalistic Laestrygonians.

Hindu
There are accounts stating humans grew to the size of giants during the Satya Yuga, the first of the four cyclical ages (yugas) in the Hindu reckoning of time.

Jain
According to Jainism, there was a time when giants walked upon this earth. Jain cosmology divides the worldly cycle of time into two parts or half-cycles, avasarpani (age of descending purity) and ascending (utsarpani).

According to Jain texts, the height of Rishabhanatha, first tirthankara of the present half-cycle of time (avasarpani) was 500 dhanusa (longbow).
In avasarpani, as the cycle moves ahead, height of all humans and animals decreases. The following table depicts the six aras of avasarpini–

Native American
According to Paiute oral history, the Si-Te-Cah or Sai'i are a legendary tribe of red-haired cannibalistic giants, the remains of which were allegedly found in 1911 by guano miners in Nevada's Lovelock Cave. Furthermore, the Paiute creation story tells of "beautiful giants" who once lived between the Sierra Nevadas and the Rocky Mountains. After giving birth to a disfigured child, the giants treated the child so poorly that the Great Spirit responded by making the land hot and desolate and allowing enemies to conquer the giants. Only two giants survived: Paiute and his wife, both of whose skin became brown from eternally living in the hot desert.

Aztec mythology features the Quinametzin, a race of giant men created in one of the previous solar eras. They are credited with the construction of Teotihuacan.

Norse

While often translated as "giants", most are described as being roughly human-sized. Some are portrayed as huge, such as some frost giants (hrímþursar), fire giants (eldjötnar), and mountain giants (bergrisar). The  are the origin of most of various monsters in Norse mythology (e.g. the Fenrisulfr) and in the eventual battle of Ragnarök, the giants will storm Asgard and fight the gods until the world is destroyed. Odin, often regarded as the chief good, is the great-grandson of the  Ymir. Norse mythology also holds that the entire world of men was created from the flesh of Ymir, a giant of cosmic proportions whose name is considered by some scholars to share a root with Yama of Indo-Iranian mythology.

Trolls are beings that are sometimes very large.

An old Icelandic legend says that two night-prowling giants, a man and a woman, were traversing the fjord near Drangey Island with their cow when they were surprised by the bright rays of daybreak. As a result of exposure to daylight, all three were turned into stone. Drangey represents the cow and Kerling (supposedly the female giant, the name means "old hag") is to the south of it. Karl (the male giant) was to the north of the island, but he disappeared long ago.

A bergrisi – the traditional Protector of Southwestern Iceland – appears as a supporter on the coat of arms of Iceland.

Roman

Several Jupiter-Giant-Columns have been found in Germania Superior. These were crowned with a statue of Jupiter, typically on horseback, defeating or trampling down a giant, often depicted as a snake. They are restricted to the area of south-western Germany, western Switzerland, French Jura, and Alsace.

Other European

In folklore from all over Europe, giants were believed to have built the remains of previous civilizations. The Danish historian, Saxo Grammaticus thought giants had a hand in the creation of megalithic monuments. Similarly, the Old English poem Seafarer speaks of the high stone walls that were the work of giants. Natural geologic features such as the massive basalt columns of the Giant's Causeway on the coast of Northern Ireland were attributed to construction by giants.

In the Netherlands, giants are often associated with creating or forming the landscape. For instance, two giants are said to have dug a channel, until they reached the village of Akkrum, where they had an argument and each went his own way, thus splitting the channel into two separate waterways. Others threw up hills, or became hills themselves when they died on the spot. In several legends, giants were evil beings that threatened, robbed and killed travellers or locals; such as Ellert and Brammert, in the province of Drenthe.

Medieval chivalry romances such as the Spanish Amadís de Gaula feature giants as antagonists, or, rarely, as allies. This is parodied famously in Cervantes' Don Quixote, when the title character attacks a windmill, believing it to be a giant. This is the source of the phrase tilting at windmills.

Tales of combat with giants were a common feature in the folklore of the British Isles. Celtic giants also figure in Breton and Arthurian romances. In Kinloch Rannoch, a local myth has a local hill resembling a giant named as The Sleeping Giant. Folklore says the giant will awaken only if a specific musical instrument is played near the hill.

Many giants in English folklore were noted for their stupidity.  A giant who had quarrelled with the Mayor of Shrewsbury went to bury the city with dirt; however, he met a shoemaker, carrying shoes to repair, and the shoemaker convinced the giant that he had worn out all the shoes coming from Shrewsbury, and so it was too far to travel. Occasionally this is inverted, however, and a long-lived giant can become known for fairness and wisdom, such as the guardian figure of Yernagate in the New Forest. Other English stories told of how giants threw stones at each other, which was used to explain many great stones on the landscape.

Giants figure in folklore and fairy tales, such as Jack the Giant Killer, The Giant Who Had No Heart in His Body, Nix Nought Nothing, Robin Hood and the Prince of Aragon, Young Ronald, and Paul Bunyan. Ogres are humanoid creatures, sometimes of gigantic stature, that occur in various sorts of European folklore.

Rübezahl, is a kind giant from German folklore who lived in the Giant Mountains, along with the Bergmönch, a giant mountain spirit.

Antero Vipunen is a giant shaman that appears in the Kalevala, meeting the epic hero Väinämöinen to teach him creation spells.

Names

 Amorites - Hebrew Bible
 Anakim - Hebrew Bible
 Asura - Indian religions
 Druon Antigoon - Dutch folklore
 Brân the Blessed - Welsh mythology
 Cewri - Welsh mythology
 Cormoran - Cornish mythology
 Cyclopes - Greek mythology
 Daidarabotchi - Japanese mythology
 Daitya - Hinduism
 Fomorians - Irish mythology
 Gigantes - Greek mythology
 Gog - Hebrew Bible
 Gogmagog - Matter of Britain
 Goliath - Book of Samuel
 Humbaba - Sumerian religion
 Ispolin - Slavic paganism
 Jentil - Basque mythology
 Jötunn - Germanic mythology
 Kalevipoeg - Estonian mythology
 Majitu - Swahili people
 Nephilim - Hebrew Bible
 Og - Book of Numbers
 Ogre - European folklore
 Paul Bunyan - American folklore
 Quinametzin - Aztec mythology
 Rakshasa - Indian religions
 Rephaite - Hebrew Bible
 Rübezahl - German folklore/Czech folklore
 Si-Te-Cah - Paiute mythology
 Stallo - Sámi shamanism
 Tepegöz - Turkic mythology
 Teutobochus - Germanic mythology
 Titans - Greek mythology
 Toell the Great - Estonian mythology
 Trolls - Nordic folklore
 Uriaș - Romanian folklore
 Ysbaddaden - Welsh mythology

See also

 A Book of Giants
 Ruth Manning-Sanders
 Giantess
 Giants (esotericism)
 Gigantism
 Half-giant
 List of giants in mythology and folklore
 List of jötnar in Norse mythology
 Megafauna
 Processional giant
 Processional giants and dragons in Belgium and France
 Somali mythology

References

Sources
 
 Childress, David Hatcher (1992). Lost Cities of North & Central America. Stelle, IL: Adventures Unlimited. 
 Dhallapiccola, Anna (2002). Dictionary of Hindu Lore and Legend, Thames & Hudson, 
  Alt URL
 Lyman, Robert R., Sr. (1971). Forbidden Land: Strange Events in the Black Forest. Vol. 1. Coudersport, PA: Potter Enterprise.* Dakhloul / Fakih debate, HHUMC (2013). Are Giants Just a Hoax?. Saida, Lebanon: Archive
 Schäfke, Werner (2015). ″Dwarves, Trolls, Ogres, and Giants″. In Albrecht Classen (Ed.): Handbook of medieval culture. Fundamental aspects and conditions of the European middle ages, vol. 1. Berlin: de Gruyter, pp. 347–383.
 

 
Fairy tale stock characters